Harbans Singh Rana is an Indian politician and member of the Bharatiya Janata Party. Rana was a member of the Himachal Pradesh Legislative Assembly from the Guler constituency in Kangra district.

References 

People from Kangra district
Bharatiya Janata Party politicians from Himachal Pradesh
Living people
21st-century Indian politicians
Year of birth missing (living people)
Himachal Pradesh MLAs 1977–1982
Himachal Pradesh MLAs 1990–1992